The Rt Rev Edward Lewis Evans (1904–1996) was Bishop of Barbados from 1960 until 1971.

He was born in 1904 and educated at Tonbridge School. He was ordained in 1938 and began his ecclesiastical career with a curacy at St Mary's, Prittlewell followed by the post of Warden of St Peter's Theological College, Jamaica. He was successively Rector of  Kingston Parish Church, Archdeacon of Surrey and then Bishop Suffragan of Kingston before his translation to Barbados. A noted author, he died on 30 December 1996.

Notes and references

1904 births
1996 deaths
People educated at Tonbridge School
Archdeacons of Surrey, Jamaica
Anglican bishops of Barbados
20th-century Anglican bishops in the Caribbean